Bartstow is a locality in Alberta, Canada.

Bartstow derives its name from the last name and middle initial of F. W. Stobart, a local storekeeper.

References 

Localities on Indian reserves in Alberta